Kagawa (written: 香川, 加川 or 賀川) is a Japanese surname. Notable people with the surname include:

Julie Kagawa (born 1982), American author
, Imperial Japanese Navy admiral
, Japanese actress
, Japanese shogi player
, Japanese archaeologist
, Japanese folk singer
, Japanese footballer
, Japanese footballer
, Japanese urologist
, Japanese footballer
, Japanese actor
, Japanese astronomer 
, Japanese pacifist and labor activist
, Japanese footballer

Japanese-language surnames